Tajpur Port is a proposed greenfield deep-sea port in Tajpur, East Midnapore district, West Bengal. The port will be built on the coast of Bay of Bengal near Tajpur. The construction of the port was awarded to the Adani Ports and Special Economic Zone Limited in September, 2022. Chief Minister Mamata Banerjee handed over Letter of Intent (LoI) to build the port to Karan Adani, son of Adani Group Chairman Gautam Adani, at the "Bijaya Sammelani" organized on October 12, 2022 at Eco Park, New Town, Kolkata. After the construction of the port, it will be the first deep-sea port in West Bengal. It is estimated that the port will be constructed at a cost of ₹25,000 crores ($3.1 billion) . 

A statement from the state government estimated that the port's net draft with tidal support would be around 16 meters, allowing Cape-sized vessels with DWT (deadweight tonnage) of 100,000 tonnes to enter the proposed port.

Location 
Tajpur Port site is situated on the coast of Bay of Bengal at Tajpur, located in the Indian state of West Bengal.

Background 
West Bengal's main port is Kolkata Port (including Haldia Port), but because of the shallow depth of the Hooghly river, it is impossible to anchor ocean-going vessels there. As a result, shipping growth is declining. Commodities in Kolkata and Asansol-Durgapur industrial region are instead taken to Paradip port. The future of the state's port industry and the Haldia industrial region is uncertain and, for this reason, the state government decided to act.

Design 
The Tajpur Port is proposed to be a large deep sea port. Land for the port will be created by reclaiming along the sea coast. The depth of the harbor will be 16 meters, which will accommodate large ships. Deep draft of 12.1 m and with tidal support of 3.9 m leading a neat 16 m draft facility enabling large Cape-size vessels of one lakh DWT. An 18-kilometer shiping channel will be constructed from the deep sea to port. Six berths are to be built in the first phase followed by an additional nine berths. By separating it from the coast, beaches are not expected to be impacted. Each terminal will be multipurpose.

Finance
It is estimated that 25 thousand crore will be required for the construction of the port. 15,000 crore will be invested in the port. Another Rs 10,000 crore will be needed for infrastructure development led by the respective ports. It will create about 25,000 jobs directly and more than one lakh jobs indirectly.

Development
In January 2019, the state decided to  develop the port on its own, as the state government alleged that the centre had done "nothing" to start work on the project in the prior three years.
 
The West Bengal government called for expressions of interest (EoI) from global agencies to set up a deep-sea port in Public-Private Partnership in East Midnapore at Tajpur on 28th December, 2020. Mamata Banerjee had announced that around ₹4,200 crore will be the investments by the State government, West Bengal Chief Minister.The project is expected to draw investments to the tune of ₹15,000 crore; There will not be any land acquisition involved as there is adequate land available for the project, she had said.

References 

Ports and harbours of West Bengal
Purba Medinipur district
Proposed ports in India